Nubanusit Lake is a  lake located on the border between Cheshire and Hillsborough counties in southwestern New Hampshire, United States, in the towns of Nelson and Hancock. The outlet of the lake is Nubanusit Brook, a tributary of the Contoocook River in the Merrimack River drainage basin.

The lake is classified as a coldwater fishery, with observed species including rainbow trout, lake trout, smallmouth bass, chain pickerel, yellow perch, and horned pout.

See also

List of lakes in New Hampshire

References

Lakes of Cheshire County, New Hampshire
Lakes of Hillsborough County, New Hampshire
Hancock, New Hampshire
Nelson, New Hampshire